Pseudopostega uncinata is a moth of the family Opostegidae. It is only known from a general savanna habitat with some adjacent gallery forests in north-central Venezuela.

The length of the forewings is 2.5–3.1 mm. Adults are mostly white with white forewings marked by a moderately large, dark brownish fuscous spot near base of hind margin. Adults have been collected in May.

Etymology
The species name is derived from the Latin uncinatus (hooked), in reference to the diagnostic, dorsally recurved apex of the male gnathos.

External links
A Revision of the New World Plant-Mining Moths of the Family Opostegidae (Lepidoptera: Nepticuloidea)

Opostegidae
Moths described in 2007